Harold Kenneth Dahl (October 19, 1923 – April 1, 2015) was an American professional basketball player. He played in the National Basketball League for the Oshkosh All-Stars and averaged 0.8 points per game.

References

External links
 Obituary

1923 births
2015 deaths
American men's basketball players
Basketball players from Wisconsin
Forwards (basketball)
Oshkosh All-Stars players
Sportspeople from Oshkosh, Wisconsin